Zip gun may refer to:

 Improvised firearm
 Hand-Held Maneuvering Unit, a device used by astronauts on spacewalks
 The ZIP .22 pistol by the U.S. Fire Arms Manufacturing Company
 Bolan's Zip Gun, a 1975 album by the band T. Rex
 Zipgun, a 1990s punk rock band from Seattle, Washington, US